Wayne Gagné  (born June 27, 1964) is a Canadian former professional ice hockey player.

Career
Wayne Gagné began his college career at Western Michigan in 1983 in Bill Wilkinson's second recruiting class. The small defenseman was an instant hit for the Broncos, scoring 43 points in 41 games in his freshman season. After declining slightly in his sophomore year he exploded for 76 points as a junior, leading all defensemen in scoring and becoming the first AHCA First Team All-American for Western Michigan (with Dan Dorion). Gagné was instrumental in helping WMU win their first CCHA Tournament, being named to the All-Tournament Team, as well as their first NCAA Tournament appearance.

Gagné performed even better in his senior season, finishing the year with the NCAA record for assists (76) for any position and points (89) for a defenseman in a season. Additionally, he also finished with the most career assists (199) and second most points for a defenseman (241) behind only Ron Wilson (Records current as of 2019). Gagné was named as the CCHA Player of the Year and was Runner-Up for the Hobey Baker Award.

After graduating Gagné played briefly for the Canadian National Team before beginning his professional career. He was drafted by the Montreal Canadiens in the  1987 NHL Supplemental Draft. He played at the top level of minor league hockey in North America for two seasons, putting up good numbers, but his small stature was an impediment for NHL teams who mostly employed large players as defensemen. With the NHL an unlikely possibility, Gagné headed to Europe in 1989, playing two seasons with SC Lyss. He finished second in team scoring both seasons, helping the team to stave off relegation twice.

Gagné spent the final three seasons of his career playing for five teams in five countries, ending as the leading scorer for Hellerup IK in 1994.

Honors
Gagné was inducted into the Western Michigan Athletic Hall of Fame in 2001 and was named to the CCHA All-Time First Team in 2013.

Career statistics

Awards and honors

References

External links

1964 births
Living people
Canadian ice hockey defencemen
Ice hockey people from Toronto
Baltimore Skipjacks players
Western Michigan Broncos men's ice hockey players
Sherbrooke Canadiens players
Peoria Rivermen (IHL) players
Kalamazoo Wings (1974–2000) players
SC Lyss players
Brantford Smoke players
Rotterdam Panda's players
Gentofte Stars players
AHCA Division I men's ice hockey All-Americans
Montreal Canadiens draft picks
National Hockey League supplemental draft picks